TDI-11861 is a chemical compound which acts as a potent  and selective inhibitor of soluble adenylyl cyclase (sAC). In animal studies it reversibly inhibits sperm motility, producing temporary infertility without hormonal side effects. While TDI-11861 is at an early developmental stage and is unlikely to be developed for medical uses in humans itself, it represents an important proof of concept which may potentially lead to the development of future male contraceptive drugs.

See also 
 JQ1
 YCT529

References 

Chloroarenes
Pyrimidines
Morpholines
Pyrazoles
Difluoromethyl compounds